(1587 – April 7, 1670) was a Japanese daimyō of the early Edo period, who ruled the Kaijū Domain. 
He was the nephew of Oda Nobunaga. Nagamasa was born in 1587, the fourth son of Nobunaga's younger brother Nagamasu. 

In his early years he became a page to Tokugawa Ieyasu, and received a stipend of 3,000 koku. In 1605, he received junior 5th rank, lower grade (ju-goi no ge) and the title of Tango no kami, though his title later changed to Saemonza. Following the Siege of Osaka in 1615, Oda Nagamasu divided up his landholdings in Yamato and Settsu Provinces, granting Nagamasa territory worth 10,000 koku. Nagamasa set up his residence at Yamaguchi village in Yamato Province, and soon after moved it to Kaijū village, from which he took the domain's name (later changed yet again, to Shibamura). At the same time, his younger brother Hisanaga received 10,000 koku, and founded the Yanagimoto Domain. Nagamasa ruled Kaijū until his retirement in late 1659, when he yielded headship to his eldest son Nagasada. After retirement, Nagamasa took the style . He died at age 84, on April 7, 1670.

Family
Father: Oda Nagamasu (1548–1622)
Brother: Oda Hisanaga

References

Oda clan
1587 births
1670 deaths
Tozama daimyo
Japanese pages